The 2016–17 FIS Ski Jumping World Cup was the 38th World Cup season in ski jumping for men, the 20th official World Cup season in ski flying and the 6th World Cup season for ladies. The season began on 26 November 2016 in Kuusamo, Finland and concluded on 26 March 2017 in Planica, Slovenia.

The season calendar was officially confirmed two months later at the congress in Cancún, Mexico. After a four-year absence, the FIS Team Tour 2017 was almost certain to return in the World Cup calendar, but cancelled in the last moment when Klingenthal had to replace Titisee-Neustadt early in the season. South Korea hosted a World Cup event for the first time, in Pyeongchang.

The first edition of the Raw Air was held this season in Norway between 10–19 March 2017 on four different hills in Oslo, Lillehammer, Trondheim, and Vikersund. The competition lasted for ten consecutive days with a total of 16 rounds in overall standings: 8 rounds from four individual events, 4 rounds from two team events and all 4 qualifications rounds. The competition also had a record high prize money of €100,000 in total for top 3 competitors in overall standings: €60,000 for the title, €30,000 for the second place and €10,000 for the third place.

This season a total of four different ski brands supplied the athletes. The two new ski manufactures premiered in the circuit and replaced the two brands that stopped the production: German company Verivox replaced Fluege.de and Slovenian company Slatnar instead of Elan. Fischer and Sport 2000 were also present.

Invention by Slovenian manufacturer, with LED lights illuminated inrun track, was presented for the first time to the public at the International Ski Federation fall meeting this season in Zürich. It premiered in December at Engelberg, since they equipped their completely new inrun track with it.

Map of world cup hosts 
All 23 locations hosting world cup events for men (19) and ladies (10) in this season. Pyeongchang was the new host in 2017.

 Raw Air
 Four Hills Tournament
 Ladies only
 New host premiere

Calendar

Men

Ladies

Men's team

Men's standings

Overall

Nations Cup

Prize money

Four Hills Tournament

Ski Flying

Raw Air

Ladies' standings

Overall

Nations Cup

Prize money

Yellow bib timeline

Men

Ladies

Raw Air

Ski Flying

Four Hills Tournament

Qualifications

Men

Ladies

Participants 
Overall, a total of 22 countries for both men and ladies participated in this season:

Achievements 

First World Cup career victory
 Domen Prevc (17), in his second season – the WC 1 in Ruka
 Maren Lundby (22), in her sixth season – the WC 3 in Nizhny Tagil
 Yūki Itō (22), in her sixth season – the WC 7 in Sapporo
 Maciej Kot (25), in his tenth season – the WC 18 in Sapporo
 Katharina Althaus (20), in her sixth season – the WC 16 in Ljubno

First World Cup podium 
 Anna Rupprecht (20), in her sixth season – the WC 1 in Lillehammer
 Markus Eisenbichler (25), in his sixth season – the WC 5 in Lillehammer
 Maciej Kot (25), in his tenth season – the WC 5 in Lillehammer
 Evgeni Klimov (22), in his second season – the WC 10 in Innsbruck 
 Robert Johansson (26), in his fourth season – the WC 10 in Innsbruck 
 Katharina Althaus (20), in her sixth season – the WC 8 in Sapporo
 Manuela Malsiner (19), in her fourth season – the WC 9 in Zao
 Svenja Würth (23), in her sixth season – the WC 16 in Ljubno

Number of wins this season (in brackets are all-time wins)
 Sara Takanashi – 9 (53)
 Stefan Kraft – 8 (12)
 Kamil Stoch – 7 (22)
 Yūki Itō – 5 (5)
 Domen Prevc – 4 (4)
 Maren Lundby – 4 (4)
 Daniel-André Tande – 2 (3)
 Maciej Kot – 2 (2)
 Severin Freund – 1 (22)
 Peter Prevc – 1 (22)
 Michael Hayböck – 1 (5)
 Andreas Wellinger – 1 (2)
 Katharina Althaus – 1 (1)

Footnotes

References

FIS Ski Jumping World Cup
World cup
World cup
Ski jumping